Sound of Hope (SOH) is an international Chinese-language radio network. Along with New Tang Dynasty Television and The Epoch Times, it is part of a network of media organizations established by practitioners of the Falun Gong new religious movement. SOH serves the Chinese diaspora in US, Europe, Australia, Japan and South Korea via AM/FM radio and Chinese people in China via shortwave radio.

Stations and programs 
SOH Network radio programs are primarily in Chinese (Mandarin and Cantonese). 

SOH is headquartered in San Francisco, California, and has two main operations. One serves Chinese Americans in the U.S. via AM/FM and the other serves China via shortwave radio. Each operation produces its own content for its audience.

The US radio started from KSQQ FM 96.1, KVTO AM 1400 during afternoon and evening hours and has grown to be the largest Chinese radio in the region, adding KQEA-LP/KQEB-LP (96.9 FM, two time-shared licenses) as affiliated stations. It provides news and lifestyle talkshows relating to local expatriate Chinese, and covers issues such as elections, local policy debates, California droughts, Cupertino city redevelopment, and the COVID-19 pandemic.

The US radio also provides network programming to 14 affiliated Chinese-language FM radios.

The China radio broadcasts to mainland China through more than 100 shortwave stations. Programs of SOH can also be listened to via online streaming and mobile apps.

SOH also produces YouTube video programs. The YouTube channel 江峰时刻 had more than half a million subscribers as of 2020. SOH teamed with Epoch Times editor John Nania to start the right-wing news website America Daily at americadaily.com.

Sound of Hope has launched iPhone and Android apps for users to listen to programs.

Relationship to Falun Gong
The Sound of Hope radio network was co-founded by Sean Lin and Allen Zeng. The network united local radio stations that had been founded by Falun Gong practitioners. It is one of a number of media outlets, such as The Epoch Times and NTDTV, started by Falun Gong practitioners who emigrated to the West. 

Most of its initial staff were Falun Gong adherents who volunteered their time and services. It was the last of the three media to be established, beginning operations in June 2003, supported by a network of volunteers that continue to maintain the station's programming. In 2005, the San Francisco Chronicle reported that the boards, including Allen Zeng and its reporting staffs of 20, were composed of Falun Gong practitioners.

References

External links
Sound of Hope Radio Network
America Daily
Nine Commentaries
Youtube Channel

Falun Gong
Radio networks
Anti-communist organizations